Liv Glaser (born 23 September 1935 in Oslo, Norway) is a Norwegian pianist, music teacher, and professor at the Norwegian Academy of Music, the daughter of violinist Ernst Glaser and pianist Kari Marie Aarvold Glaser, and married 1971 to director of culture Carsten Edvard Munch (1927–2005).

Biography 
Glaser was raised in a family where both parents were professional musicians. From 1952 to 1956 she studied with classical pianist Robert Riefling, and later with Vlado Perlemuter in Paris. Her debut concert was in Oslo in 1960. She has lectured at the Norwegian Academy of Music from 1973, where she was appointed professor in 1994. Her paternal half-brother is cellist Ernst Simon Glaser.

Glaser has cooperated with the conductor Sir John Barbirolli. Having been a soloist in Prokofiev's third piano concerto, in Oslo under his taktstock, he invited her to Hallé Orchestra in Manchester 1962, with the same concert, and in 1963 she played Grieg's A minor concert with him and Hallé Orchestra on tour.

Glaser's repertoire ranges widely. She has played a lot of French music that she became close to during their studies in Paris. The classical repertoire might have been her closest, but she has also performed much Norwegian music, especially chamber music Grieg and compositions for piano solo, and has for many years been a regular performer at the Festspillene i Bergen (Bergen International Festival). She has collaborated with Arve Tellefsen for several years.

She was appointed Commander of the Royal Norwegian Order of St. Olav in 2018.

Honors 
1988: Gammleng-prisen in the category Classic
2004: Lindeman-prisen

Discography 

Edvard Grieg
1965: Lyric Pieces Vol. I (RCA Victor Red Seal)
1965: Lyric Pieces Vol. II (RCA Victor Red Seal)
1965: Lyric Pieces Vol. III (RCA Victor Red Seal)
1965: Lyric Pieces Vol. IV Concluded (RCA Victrola)
2007: Lyrical Travels With Edvard Grieg (Simax Classics)

Klaus Egge
1971: Sonata for violin and piano op. 3 (Philips Classics), feat. Arve Tellefsen

Agathe Backer Grøndahl
1975: Romanser (Norsk Kulturråds Klassikerserie), feat. Kari Frisell
1975: Klaverstykker (Norsk Kulturråds Klassikerserie)
1988: Piano Pieces And Songs (Norsk Kulturråds Klassikerserie), compilation feat. Kari Frisell

Wolfgang Amadeus Mozart
1991: Mozart Piano Sonatas, No. 1, 2, 3, 4 and 5 (Simax Classics)
1993: Mozart Piano Sonatas, No. 6, 11 and 14 (Simax Classics)
1995: Mozart Piano Sonatas, No. 7, 8, 9 and 10 (Simax Classics)
1999: Mozart Piano Sonatas, No. 12, 13 and 17 (Simax Classics)
2000: Mozart Piano Sonatas, No. 15, 16 and 18 (Simax Classics)

Franz Schubert
1997: Schubert, Die Schöne Müllerin (Simax Classics), feat. Per Vollestad

Dedicated Ernst Glaser's 100 years anniversary
2004: Schubert & Schumann (Simax Classics), feat. Ernst Simon Glaser

Other
2006: Muzio Clementi For All Ages (Simax Classics), recited on a Longman & Clementi 1799
2014: Liebestreu (LAWO), feat. Helene Wold

References

External links 
 at the Norwegian Academy of Music
Liv Glaser – Biography at Grappa Music
Ta det piano – Liv Glaser 02.04.1992 at NRK 

1935 births
Living people
Musicians from Oslo
Norwegian Jews
Norwegian classical pianists
Norwegian women pianists
Women classical pianists
Academic staff of the Norwegian Academy of Music
Child refugees
Norwegian refugees
Refugees in Sweden